The Honda CBF models are a series of Honda standard motorcycles. With the exception of the single-cylinder CBF125, CBF150M, CBF190R and CBF250, all CBF motorbikes have inline engines.

Types
The series includes:

Single-cylinder
 CBF125 (2008–2018)
 CBF150M (2005-2012)
 CBF190R (2015–present)
 CBF250 (2004–2012)

Inline-twin
 CBF500 (2004–2008)

Inline-four
 CBF600 (2004–2013)
 CBF1000 (2006–2018)

CBF series
Standard motorcycles